Saul Wade (8 February 1858 – 5 November 1931) was an English first-class cricketer, who played 66 matches for Yorkshire County Cricket Club from 1886 to 1890.

Born in Farsley in Leeds, Wade was a useful all-rounder, being a right-handed batsman and off spin bowler.  He scored 1,616 runs at 16.83 in the seventy first-class matches he played in, with a best of 74 not out against Middlesex.  He claimed thirty one catches, and took 139 wickets at 18.75, with a best performance of 7 for 28 against Gloucestershire.

He also appeared for M.B. Hawke's XI (1885), North of England (1887), Lord Hawke's XI (1889), L. Hall's XI (1889), Miscellaneous Yorkshire (1887-1890) and Blackpool and District (1893).

He was a leading all-rounder in the Leeds district for several years, before going to Saddleworth C.C. in 1880. He was later a professional in the Lancashire League with Church C.C. and Accrington C.C. Wade subsequently he became a first-class umpire.

Wade died in November 1931 in Oldham, Lancashire, aged 73.

References

External links
Cricinfo Profile

1858 births
1931 deaths
Yorkshire cricketers
Cricketers from Pudsey
English cricketers
North v South cricketers
Lord Hawke's XI cricketers